Ras-related protein R-Ras is a protein that in humans is encoded by the RRAS gene.

Interactions 

RRAS has been shown to interact with:

 ARAF, 
 Bcl-2, 
 NCK1, 
 RALGDS, and
 RASSF5.

References

Further reading